Hawker v Vickers [1991] 1 NZLR 399 is a cited case in New Zealand regarding property law.

References

1989 in New Zealand law
1989 in case law
High Court of New Zealand cases
Property case law